The Guangzhou Symphony Orchestra (GSO) is an orchestra based in Guangzhou, Guangdong. It was founded in 1957.

The orchestra's current artistic director is Long Yu (余隆). It is the only Chinese symphony orchestra that has toured five continents.

Greg Patillo, famous beatboxing flutist, was the acting principal flute of the orchestra at one time.

Guangzhou Symphony Youth Orchestra

In July, 2011, Guangzhou Symphony Orchestra founded its affiliated youth orchestra, Guangzhou Symphony Youth Orchestra, with Huan Jing as its artistic director.

See also
 Chinese music

References

External links
Guangzhou Symphony Orchestra official site
List of Symphony Orchestras in Greater China -PRC. HKSAR. Macao SAR and Taiwan

Culture in Guangzhou
China orchestras
Musical groups established in 1957
Tourist attractions in Guangzhou